Rama Krishna Sithanen, GCSK, MP (born Tamil: இராம சித்தனன் Hindi: राम कृष्ण सिथनेन on 21 April 1954) is a former finance minister of Mauritius and vice-prime minister of Mauritius and has held the office between 1991 and 1995 when Sir Anerood Jugnauth was Prime Minister and from 2005 to 2010 Navin Ramgoolam's Cabinet. 

In 2011, Dr Sithanen worked as Director of Strategy at the African Development Bank. In the same year he took up the role of Chairman and Director of International Financial Services ("IFS"), a large management company in Mauritius. In 2016, he became the Chairman of Sanne Group PLC's Mauritius branch, following its acquisition of IFS. Between 2013 and 2017, he chaired the Rwanda Development Board. In 2022, Apex Group, a global financial solution provider, acquired Sanne Group PLC and in 2023 Dr Sithanen has become Independent Director and Chairperson of Apex Group's Mauritius group of companies.

Background and education

Dr Sithanen comes from a modest background, due to poverty he was forced to abandon school to work at an early age. However, later on, young Rama took back his studies and went to London School of Economics to read economics and completed a Bsc (Econ) First Class Honours and a Msc (Econ) with distinction. Later on, during his mandate as Finance minister he obtained a PhD in Politics at the age of 51, while his thesis was 'An examination of alternative electoral systems for Mauritius' from Brunel University.

Honours
He was honored by the President and was promoted to the highest rank in the Order of the Star and Key of the Indian Ocean and received the grade of Grand Commander and therefore use the prefix Hon. and post nominal GCSK.

References

External links
 brunel.ac.uk
 labourparty.mu
 apexgroup.com

Members of the National Assembly (Mauritius)
1954 births
Living people
Mauritian people of Indian descent
Militant Socialist Movement politicians
Mauritian Hindus
Mauritian people of Tamil descent
Labour Party (Mauritius) politicians
Ministers of Finance of Mauritius
Grand Commanders of the Order of the Star and Key of the Indian Ocean
Vice Prime Ministers of Mauritius